αΒΒ is a second-order deterministic global optimization algorithm for finding the optima of general, twice continuously differentiable functions. The algorithm is based around creating a relaxation for nonlinear functions of general form by superposing them with a quadratic of sufficient magnitude, called α, such that the resulting superposition is enough to overcome the worst-case scenario of non-convexity of the original function. Since a quadratic has a diagonal Hessian matrix, this superposition essentially adds a number to all diagonal elements of the original Hessian, such that the resulting Hessian is positive-semidefinite. Thus, the resulting relaxation is a convex function.

Theory 

Let a function  be a function of general non-linear non-convex structure, defined in a finite box 
.
a sum of univariate quadratics, each of sufficient magnitude to overcome the non-convexity of 

 is called the  underestimator for general functional forms. 

Calculation of  

There are numerous methods to calculate the values of the  vector.

One of the most popular methods to get these valid bounds on eigenvalues is by use of the Scaled Gerschgorin theorem.

References

Deterministic global optimization